Located in Smithville, Ohio, Oak Grove Mennonite Church is an historical church that has made a significant contribution to the larger Mennonite denomination, currently pastored by Doug Zehr. Oak Grove started as an Amish church in 1818, as many Amish started settling in Wayne County, Ohio.  From humble beginnings the church grew and built a meetinghouse in 1862, one of the earliest of such meetinghouses the Amish have built.

A notable leader of the Amish church at this time was bishop John K. Yoder, who led the church from 1855–1906.  Bishop Yoder's main contribution to Oak Grove was his progressive attitude toward Amish doctrine.  In 1862, John K. Yoder moderated the first meeting of the Diener Versammlungen.  Diener Versammlungen, from 1862–1878 were denominational meetings in which Amish ministers met to discuss changes in the Ordnung.  The very idea of a churchwide meeting for Amish was revolutionary; however once the meetings started, it became clear that the majority of the leaders there were more change-minded than interested in keeping with tradition.  Thus, conservative opposition was given a chance to speak, and the opposition gave the leaders a clear ultimatum.  After 1863, many of the conservative ministers removed themselves from the meeting, and as such, John K. Yoder led toward progress, forming an "orphan congregation" which became Amish-Mennonite.  With John K. Yoder as Oak Grove's bishop, it was seen as the leading congregation in which as many as 5,000 Ohio Amish became known as Amish Mennonites.  After several decades of relative obscurity, Amish-Mennonites later dropped Amish from their name and joined "Old" Mennonites in the Ohio Conference of the Mennonite Church.  Theologian John Howard Yoder is from this church.

Lead Pastors:
Christian Brandt: 1818–1866
David Zook: unknown
Peter Schrock: unknown–1846
Solomon Zook: unknown–1870
Peter Nafziger: unknown–1841
John Fertenwald: 1831–1849
Joseph Frey: unknown
Hannes Yoder: unknown–1850
Emmanuel Hochstetler: 1855–1862
Jacob Yoder: 1850–1858
Peter Blough: 1855–unknown
Christian Nafziger: 1844–1864
Christian Schantz: unknown
John K. Yoder: 1855–1906
Christian Conrad: 1859–1890
Christian K. Yoder: 1861–1871
Jonathon Smucker: 1861–1887
John Smiley: 1866–1878
D.Z. Yoder: 1872–1929
David Hostetler: 1880–1889
Isaac Miller: 1891–1894
Benjamin Gerig: 1895–1913
J.S. Gerig: 1896–1925
C.Z. Yoder: 1904–1930s  John K. Yoder's son, John Smiley his father-in-law
Peter R. Lantz: 1909–1927 Elkhart Institute
Jesse N. Smucker:1931–1936 Princeton Seminary for one year, Hartford Theological Seminary
William G. Detweiler: 1938–1947 Temple University. Started Mennonite radio show The Calvary Hour.  First pastor of Smithville Mennonite
Virgil O. Gerig: 1947–1960  College of Wooster, economics, Oberlin Graduate School of Theology, Michigan State, Harvard Divinity School, Princeton Theological Seminary
Robert Otto: 1960–1965 Goshen College, Goshen Biblical Seminary
Lotus Troyer: 1965–1971 Goshen College
Peter Wiebe: 1972–1984 Goshen College and Goshen Biblical Seminary
Jim Schrag: 1985–1994 Bethel College KS, Associated Mennonite Biblical Seminary
Dennis Schmidt: 1994–1996
Norma Duerkson: 1993–2008  Bethel College KS, Associated Mennonite Biblical Seminary
Will Shertzer: 2008–2009 Interim pastor
Doug Zehr: 2009–present

See also
Alexanderwohl Mennonite Church
Howard-Miami Mennonite Church

References

Further reading
Creative Congregationalism by James O. Lehman
Living Our Name by Schmucker, Wolfe, and Cohn

External links
Official website
Oak Grove Mennonite Church (Smithville, Wayne County, Ohio, USA) at Global Anabaptist Mennonite Encyclopedia Online

Mennonite church buildings in Ohio
Mennonite congregations
Religious organizations established in 1818
Buildings and structures in Wayne County, Ohio
1818 establishments in Ohio